Kʼan Joy Chitam I, also known as Hok, Kan Xul I and Kʼan Hokʼ Chitam I, (May 3, 490 – February 6, 565) was an ajaw of the Maya city-state of Palenque. He took the throne on February 6, 529 at age 34, ending an interregnum that had lasted for a little over four years.

Notes

Sources 

490 births
565 deaths
Rulers of Palenque
6th-century monarchs in North America
6th century in the Maya civilization